Alex Tolio (born 30 March 2000) is an Italian racing cyclist, who currently rides for UCI ProTeam .

Major results
2018
 10th Overall Giro della Lunigiana
2019
 1st 
2020
 1st Gran Premio Città di Empoli
 10th Trofeo Città di San Vendemiano
2021
 1st Strade Bianche di Romagna
 1st 
 3rd GP Capodarco
 9th Trofeo Città di San Vendemiano
2022
 3rd Ruota d'Oro
 4th Gran Premio Sportivi di Poggiana
 7th GP Capodarco
2023
 8th Overall Tour du Rwanda

References

External links
 

2000 births
Living people
Italian male cyclists
People from Bassano del Grappa
Cyclists from Veneto